Corte Alto Airport,  is an airport  south of Purranque, a town in the Los Lagos Region of Chile.

Runway 36 has an additional  grass overrun available.

See also

Transport in Chile
List of airports in Chile

References

External links
OpenStreetMap - Corte Alto
OurAirports - Corte Alto
FallingRain - Corte Alto Airport

Airports in Los Lagos Region